Home is the fifth and final studio album by the Canadian country music group The Wilkinsons, released on March 20, 2007. Five singles were released from the album: "Six Pack", "Fast Car", "Papa Come Quick", "Nobody Died" and "Closets".

Track listing
 "Fast Car" (Tracy Chapman) - 3:48
 "Trees" (Steve Wilkinson, Rob Crosby) - 3:27
 "Solitary Tear" (S. Wilkinson, Charlie Craig) - 3:26
 "Closets" (S. Wilkinson, Gary Burr) - 3:42
 "Papa Come Quick" (Billy Vera, Chip Taylor, Maurice Richard Hirsch) - 2:41
 "I Wish It Would Rain" (S. Wilkinson, Craig) - 3:23
 "Dying to Start Living" (S. Wilkinson, Crosby) - 3:39
 "Home" (S. Wilkinson, Amanda Wilkinson, Tyler Wilkinson) - 3:39
 "Six Pack" (S. Wilkinson, Tony Haselden) - 3:42
 "I Want to Fall Asleep in Your Arms" (S. Wilkinson, Crosby) - 3:56
 "Under the Rainbow" (S. Wilkinson, Crosby, Phillip White) - 3:16
 "Big Pockets" (S. Wilkinson, Craig) - 3:32
 "Thank You" (S. Wilkinson, William Wallace) - 3:53
 "Nobody Died" (Haselden) - 3:06

Album notes
Track 7 performed by Tyler Wilkinson
Tracks 9 & 12 performed by Steve Wilkinson
Track 8 is a duet by Amanda Wilkinson & Tyler Wilkinson
All other songs performed by Amanda Wilkinson

Musicians
 Martin Aucoin – piano, synthesizer
 Craig Bignell – drums
 Joe Chemay – bass guitar
 John Dymond – bass guitar, shaker
 Larry Franklin – fiddle, mandolin
 Sonny Garrish – pedal steel guitar
 David Kalmusky – acoustic guitar, electric guitar, mandolin
 Jerry Kimbrough – bouzouki, acoustic guitar
 Steve O'Connor – piano
 Steve Smith – dobro, pedal steel guitar

The Wilkinsons albums
2007 albums